The 2021 Sprecher 150 was the 16th stock car race of the 2021 ARCA Menards Series season, the seventh race of the 2021 ARCA Menards Series East season, the eighth race of the 2021 Sioux Chief Showdown, and the sixth iteration of the event. The race was held on Sunday, August 29, 2021, in West Allis, Wisconsin at the Milwaukee Mile, a  permanent oval-shaped, low-banked racetrack. The race took the scheduled 150 laps to complete. At race's end, Ty Gibbs of Joe Gibbs Racing would dominate the race, leading every lap en route to his 17th career ARCA Menards Series win and his ninth of the season. To fill out the podium, Sam Mayer of Bret Holmes Racing and Daniel Dye of GMS Racing would finish second and third, respectively.

Background 
The Milwaukee Mile is a one-mile-long (1.6 km) oval race track in the central United States, located on the grounds of the Wisconsin State Fair Park in West Allis, Wisconsin, a suburb west of Milwaukee. Its grandstand and bleachers seated approximately 37,000 spectators. Paved 67 years ago in 1954, it was originally a dirt track. In addition to the oval, there was a 1.8 mile (2.8 km) road circuit located on the infield.

As the oldest operating motor speedway in the world, the Milwaukee Mile has hosted at least one auto race every year from 1903 to 2015 (except during U.S. involvement in World War II). The track has held events sanctioned by major bodies, such as the AAA, USAC, NASCAR, CART/Champ Car World Series, and the IndyCar Series. There have also been many races in regional series such as ARTGO.

Entry list

Practice 
The only 45-minute practice session would occur on Sunday, August 29, at 10:00 AM CST.

Qualifying 
Qualifying would occur on Sunday, August 29, at 11:30 AM CST. The qualifying system used was a timed session.

Full qualifying results

Race results

References 

2021 ARCA Menards Series
2021 ARCA Menards Series East
NASCAR races at the Milwaukee Mile
Sprecher 150
Sprecher 150